Kani Savaran (also Romanized as Kānī Savārān, Kānī Savarān, and Kāni Sawārān) is a village in Amirabad Rural District, Muchesh District, Kamyaran County, Kurdistan Province, Iran. At the 2006 census, its population was 80, in 27 families. The village is populated by Kurds.

References 

Towns and villages in Kamyaran County
Kurdish settlements in Kurdistan Province